McCaysville is a city in Fannin County, Georgia, United States. The population was 1,149 at the 2020 census.

History
Prior to European colonization, the area that is now McCaysville was inhabited by the Cherokee people and other Indigenous peoples for thousands of years.

The town is also the center of an adoption scandal.

Geography

McCaysville is located along the northern border of Fannin County and the state of Georgia at  (34.981534, -84.370293). It is bordered to the north by its twin city of Copperhill, Tennessee. The two are situated as a single town along a river, known as the Toccoa River in Georgia and the Ocoee River in Tennessee. The change takes place in the middle of town at the state line, which runs diagonally relative to the street grid, which is aligned with the river rather than the border. The boundary also means that the McCaysville side is in area code 706, while the Copperhill side is in area code 423.

The main street through town is Georgia 60 (Toccoa Avenue) and Tennessee 68 (Ocoee Street). SR 60 leads southeast  to Mineral Bluff, Georgia, while SR 68 leads north  to Ducktown, Tennessee. Georgia State Route 5 crosses the Toccoa River and leads south  to Blue Ridge, the Fannin County seat.

In the early morning hours of February 16, 1990, a massive flood struck the towns.

Climate

McCaysville's weather is temperate due to its elevation and location in the southern Appalachians. Summers are warm with average highs in the middle 80s and lows in the lower 60s. Winters are cool with average highs in the 40s and average lows in the 20s. Rainfall is abundant with the yearly average approaching 67 inches and occurring on 127 days. Snowfall usually occurs on several occasions during the winter months and can range from a light dusting to the occasional significant storm. The most significant snow storm to hit the area occurred March 12–14, 1993, when the area received approximately 40 inches in what eastern seaboard residents often refer to as "the storm of the century". The average first frost occurs in mid-October with the average last frost occurring in late April.

Demographics

2020 census

As of the 2020 United States census, there were 1,149 people, 605 households, and 320 families residing in the city.

2010 census
As of the 2010 United States Census, there were 1,056 people living in the city. The racial makeup of the city was 97.8% White, 0.2% Black, 0.6% Asian and 0.6% from two or more races. 0.9% were Hispanic or Latino of any race.

2000 census
As of the census of 2000, there were 1,071 people, 540 households, and 324 families living in the city. The racial makeup of the city was 97.11% White, 0.19% African American, 0.65% Native American, 0.19% Asian, 0.93% from other races, and 0.93% from two or more races. Hispanic or Latino of any race were 1.40% of the population.

There were 540 households, out of which 20.7% had children under the age of 18 living with them, 40.9% were married couples living together, 14.8% had a female householder with no husband present, and 40.0% were non-families. 38.3% of all households were made up of individuals, and 23.9% had someone living alone who was 65 years of age or older.  The average household size was 1.98 and the average family size was 2.57.

In the city, the population was spread out, with 17.9% under the age of 18, 6.3% from 18 to 24, 20.6% from 25 to 44, 26.3% from 45 to 64, and 28.8% who were 65 years of age or older.  The median age was 48 years. For every 100 females, there were 77.6 males.  For every 100 females age 18 and over, there were 73.7 males.

The median income for a household in the city was $18,583, and the median income for a family was $30,078. Males had a median income of $27,045 versus $20,185 for females. The per capita income for the city was $12,904.  About 14.0% of families and 23.2% of the population were below the poverty line, including 23.7% of those under age 18 and 24.8% of those age 65 or over.

Notable person
Joe Tipton, Major League Baseball catcher

References

External links

Blue Ridge Mountain News

Cities in Georgia (U.S. state)
Cities in Fannin County, Georgia
Copper Basin (Tennessee)